Usual may refer to:
Common
Normal
Standard